National Primary Route 17, or just Route 17 (or ) is a National Road Route of Costa Rica, located in the Puntarenas province.

Description
In Puntarenas province the route covers Puntarenas canton (Puntarenas, Barranca, Chacarita, El Roble districts).

References

Highways in Costa Rica